Thomas Bainbridge (May 1, 1831 in County Durham, England – November 17, 1901 in Lafayette County, Wisconsin)was a member of the Wisconsin State Assembly during the 1872 and 1881 sessions. Other positions he held include Town Clerk of Benton (town), Wisconsin. He was a Republican. Bainbridge was born on May 1, 1831, in County Durham, England.

References

People from County Durham
English emigrants to the United States
19th-century English politicians
People from Lafayette County, Wisconsin
City and town clerks
Republican Party members of the Wisconsin State Assembly
1831 births
1901 deaths
19th-century American politicians